List of missions to minor planets is a listing of spaceflight missions to minor planets, which are category of astronomical body that excludes planets, moons and comets, but orbit the Sun. Most missions to minor planets have been to asteroids or dwarf planets.

Spacecraft visits to minor planets have mostly been flybys, and have ranged from dedicated missions to incidental flybys and targets of opportunity for spacecraft that have already completed their missions. The first spacecraft to visit an asteroid was Pioneer 10, which flew past an unnamed asteroid on 2 August 1972; a distant incidental encounter while the probe was en route to Jupiter. The first dedicated mission was NEAR Shoemaker, which was launched in February 1996, and entered orbit around 433 Eros in February 2000, having first flown past 253 Mathilde. NEAR was also the first spacecraft to land on an asteroid, surviving what was intended to be an impact with Eros at 20:01 on 12 February 2001 at the planned end of its mission. As a result of its unexpected survival, the spacecraft's mission was extended until 1 March to allow data to be collected from the surface.

Many minor planets are in two rings:
Asteroid belt, between 2-3 AU 
Kuiper belt, between 30 and 60 AU

See also
 List of minor planets and comets visited by spacecraft
 List of missions to comets

References

 

 
Missions to minor planets